Todd Lowrie (born 14 July 1983) is an Australian former professional rugby league footballer.

Early years
In his younger years Lowrie was a State representative athlete in a number of track, field and sporting events.

His father, Bert Lowrie, is the current team manager for the State of Origin NSW Blues, and has a major role in the Country Rugby League.

Playing career
A Scone Thoroughbreds junior, Lowrie began his career with the Newcastle Knights between 2003 and 2006.

He joined the Parramatta Eels in 2007. After a few extensive injuries to the Parramatta Eels squad Lowrie was given a chance in the first-grade run on side, he played almost every game of the 2009 season and has proved himself to be a valuable and hard-working asset to the team.  Lowrie played for Parramatta in the 2009 NRL grand final against Melbourne where despite a second half comeback the eels went down 23-16.

The Melbourne Storm announced the signing of Todd Lowrie for the 2010 and 2011 seasons.  In the first season that Lowrie joined Melbourne, the club were stripped of the two premierships they won and ordered to play the 2010 season for no points after it was revealed the club deliberately breached the salary cap from 2006 until 2010. He played in their 2012 Grand Final victory over Canterbury-Bankstown.

In 2013, Lowrie signed the New Zealand Warriors for two seasons. After the 2013 season Lowrie was released on compassionate grounds.

After his release from the Warriors, Lowrie was signed by the Brisbane Broncos. Just two days before the Broncos 2014 match against the Manly-Warringah Sea Eagles, Lowrie commented on Brookvale Oval, labelling it a "shithole", claiming that "the [field is] heavy, muddy and boggy". On the night of the game, Lowrie was interchanged into the match and met with a chorus of boos from the Manly fans. He played 18 games for the Broncos in the 2014 NRL season but did not play a first grade game in 2015, instead playing for the Norths Devils in the Queensland Cup.

On 25 July 2015, Lowrie signed a one-year contract to return to the Newcastle Knights starting in 2016. However, on 6 November 2015, before playing a game, he announced his retirement from rugby league to instead take up the Knights' NYC head coaching role.

References

External links

Brisbane Broncos profile
Parramatta Eels profile

1983 births
Living people
Australian rugby league players
Newcastle Knights players
Parramatta Eels players
Melbourne Storm players
New Zealand Warriors players
Brisbane Broncos players
Scone Thoroughbreds players
Wentworthville Magpies players
Norths Devils players
Rugby league locks
Rugby league second-rows
Rugby league players from Scone, New South Wales